Zhao Chen (born 24 June 1989) in Shenyang is a Chinese international handballer, who plays for Croatian club RK Zamet.

As an international for the China men's national handball team he has competed at the 2010 Asian Games, 2010 Asian Championship, 2012 Asian Championship, 2014 Asian Championship, 2016 Asian Championship and 2018 Asian Championship

References

External links
 Rk-zamet.hr

1989 births
Living people
Sportspeople from Shenyang
Handball players at the 2010 Asian Games
Handball players from Rijeka
RK Zamet players
Chinese male handball players
Handball players from Liaoning
Asian Games competitors for China